Tell Brak (Nagar, Nawar) was an ancient city in Syria; its remains constitute a tell located in the Upper Khabur region, near the modern village of Tell Brak, 50 kilometers north-east of Al-Hasaka city, Al-Hasakah Governorate. The city's original name is unknown. During the second half of the third millennium BC, the city was known as Nagar and later on, Nawar.

Starting as a small settlement in the seventh millennium BC, Tell Brak evolved during the fourth millennium BC into one of the biggest cities in Upper Mesopotamia, and interacted with the cultures of southern Mesopotamia. The city shrank in size at the beginning of the third millennium BC with the end of Uruk period, before expanding again around c. 2600 BC, when it became known as Nagar, and was the capital of a regional kingdom that controlled the Khabur river valley. Nagar was destroyed around c. 2300 BC, and came under the rule of the Akkadian Empire, followed by a period of independence as a Hurrian city-state, before contracting at the beginning of the second millennium BC. Nagar prospered again by the 19th century BC, and came under the rule of different regional powers. In c. 1500 BC, Tell Brak was a center of Mitanni before being destroyed by Assyria c. 1300 BC. The city never regained its former importance, remaining as a small settlement, and abandoned at some points of its history, until disappearing from records during the early Abbasid era.

Different peoples inhabited the city, including the Halafians, Semites and the Hurrians. Tell Brak was a religious center from its earliest periods; its famous Eye Temple is unique in the Fertile Crescent, and its main deity, Belet Nagar, was revered in the entire Khabur region, making the city a pilgrimage site. The culture of Tell Brak was defined by the different civilizations that inhabited it, and it was famous for its glyptic style, equids and glass. When independent, the city was ruled by a local assembly or by a monarch. Tell Brak was a trade center due to its location between Anatolia, the Levant and southern Mesopotamia. It was excavated by Max Mallowan in 1937, then regularly by different teams between 1979 and 2011, when the work stopped due to the Syrian Civil War.

Name

The original name of the city is unknown; Tell Brak is the current name of the tell. East of the mound lies a dried lake named "Khatuniah" which was recorded as "Lacus Beberaci" (the lake of Brak) in the Roman map Tabula Peutingeriana. The lake was probably named after Tell Brak which was the nearest camp in the area. The name "Brak" might therefore be an echo of the most ancient name.

During the third millennium BC, the city was known as "Nagar", which might be of Semitic origin and mean a "cultivated place". The name "Nagar" ceased occurring following the Old Babylonian period, however, the city continued to exist as Nawar, under the control of Hurrian state of Mitanni. Hurrian kings of Urkesh took the title "King of Urkesh and Nawar" in the third millennium BC; although there is general view that the third millennium BC Nawar is identical with Nagar, some scholars, such as Jesper Eidem, doubt this. Those scholars opt for a city closer to Urkesh which was also called Nawala/Nabula as the intended Nawar.

History

Early settlement
The earliest period A, is dated to the proto Halaf culture c. 6500 BC, when a small settlement existed. Many objects dated to that period were discovered including the Halaf pottery. By 5000 BC, Halaf culture transformed into Northern Ubaid, and many Ubaid materials were found in Tell Brak. Excavations and surface survey of the site and its surroundings, unearthed a large platform of patzen bricks that dates to late Ubaid, and revealed that Tell Brak developed as an urban center slightly earlier than better known cities of southern Mesopotamia, such as Uruk.

The first city

In southern Mesopotamia, the original Ubaid culture evolved into the Uruk period. The people of the southern Uruk period used military and commercial means to expand the civilization. In Northern Mesopotamia, the post Ubaid period is designated Late Chalcolithic / Northern Uruk period, during which, Tell Brak started to expand.

Period Brak E witnessed the building of the city's walls, and Tell Brak expansion beyond the mound to form a lower town. By the late 5th millennium BC, Tell Brak reached the size of c. 55 hectares. Area TW of the tell (Archaeologists divided Tell Brak into areas designated with Alphabetic letters. See the map for Tell Brak's areas) revealed the remains of a monumental building with two meters thick walls and a basalt threshold. In front of the building, a sherd paved street was discovered, leading to the northern entrance of the city. Area TW covered an area of nearly 600 square meters up to a depth of 10 meters.

The city continued to expand during period F, and reached the size of 130 hectares. Four mass graves, mainly sub-adults and young adults, dating to c. 3800–3600 BC were discovered in the submound, Tell Majnuna (built entirely of rubbish over two centuries), north of the main tell, and they suggest that the process of urbanization was accompanied by internal social stress, and an increase in the organization of warfare.
 The first half of period F (designated LC3), saw the erection of the Eye Temple, which was named for the thousands of small alabaster "Eye idols" and "Spectacle-topped idols" figurines discovered in it. Those idols were also found in area TW.

Interactions with the Mesopotamian south grew during the second half of period F (designated LC4) c. 3600 BC, and an Urukean colony was established in the city. With the end of Uruk culture c 3000 BC, Tell Brak's Urukean colony was abandoned and deliberately leveled by its occupants. Tell Brak contracted during the following periods H and J, and became limited to the mound. Evidence exists for an interaction with the Mesopotamian south during period H, represented by the existence of materials similar to the ones produced during the southern Jemdet Nasr period. The city remained a small settlement during the Ninevite 5 period, with a small temple and associated sealing activities.

Kingdom of Nagar

Around c. 2600 BC, a large administrative building was built and the city expanded out of the tell again. The revival is connected with the Kish civilization, and the city was named "Nagar". Amongst the important buildings dated to the kingdom, is an administrative building or temple named the "Brak Oval", located in area TC. The building have a curved exterior wall reminiscent of the Khafajah "Oval Temple" in central Mesopotamia. However, aside from the wall, the comparison between the two buildings in terms of architecture is difficult, as each building follows a different plan.

The oldest references to Nagar comes from Mari and tablets discovered at Nabada. However, the most important source on Nagar come from the archives of Ebla. Most of the texts record the ruler of Nagar using his title "En", without mentioning a name. However a text from Ebla mentions Mara-Il, a king of Nagar; thus, he is the only ruler known by name for pre-Akkadian Nagar and ruled a little more than a generation before the kingdom's destruction.

At its height, Nagar encompassed most of the southwestern half of the Khabur Basin, and was a diplomatic and political equal of the Eblaite and Mariote states. The kingdom included at least 17 subordinate cities, such as Hazna, and most importantly Nabada, which was a city-state annexed by Nagar, and served as a provincial capital. Nagar was involved in the wide diplomatic network of Ebla, and the relations between the two kingdoms involved both confrontations and alliances. A text from Ebla mentions a victory of Ebla's king (perhaps Irkab-Damu) over Nagar. However, a few years later, a treaty was concluded, and the relations progressed toward a dynastic marriage between princess Tagrish-Damu of Ebla, and prince Ultum-Huhu, Nagar's monarch's son.

Nagar was defeated by Mari in year seven of the Eblaite vizier Ibrium's term, causing the blockage of trade routes between Ebla and southern Mesopotamia via upper Mesopotamia. Later, Ebla's king Isar-Damu concluded an alliance with Nagar and Kish against Mari, and the campaign was headed by the Eblaite vizier Ibbi-Sipish, who led the combined armies to victory in a battle near Terqa. Afterwards, the alliance attacked the rebellious Eblaite vassal city of Armi. Ebla was destroyed approximately three years after Terqa's battle, and soon after, Nagar followed in c. 2300 BC.Large parts of the city were burned, an act attributed either to Mari, or Sargon of Akkad.

Akkadian period

Following its destruction, Nagar was rebuilt by the Akkadian empire, to form a center of the provincial administration. The city included the whole tell and a lower town at the southern edge of the mound. Two public buildings were built during the early Akkadian periods, one complex in area SS, and another in area FS. The building of area FS included its own temple and might have served as a caravanserai, being located near the northern gate of the city. The temple was dedicated to the god Šamagan, god of animals of the steppe. The early Akkadian monarchs were occupied with internal conflicts, and Tell Brak was temporarily abandoned by Akkad at some point preceding the reign of Naram-Sin. The abandonment might be connected with an environmental event, that caused the desertification of the region.

The destruction of Nagar's kingdom created a power vacuum in the Upper Khabur. The Hurrians, formerly concentrated in Urkesh, took advantage of the situation to control the region as early as Sargon's latter years. Tell Brak was known as "Nawar" for the Hurrians, and kings of Urkesh took the title "King of Urkesh and Nawar", first attested in the seal of Urkesh's king Atal-Shen.

The use of the title continued during the reigns of Atal-Shen's successors, Tupkish and Tish-Atal, who ruled only in Urkesh. The Akkadians under Naram-Sin incorporated Nagar firmly into their empire. The most important Akkadian building in the city is called the "Palace of Naram-Sin", which had parts of it built over the original Eye Temple. Despite its name, the palace is closer to a fortress, as it was more of a fortified depot for the storage of collected tribute rather than a residential seat. The palace was burned during Naram-Sin's reign, perhaps by a Lullubi attack, and the city was burned toward the end of the Akkadian period c. 2193 BC, probably by the Gutians.

Post-Akkadian kingdom
The Akkadian period was followed by period N, during which Nagar was the center of an independent Hurrian dynasty, evidenced by the discovery of a seal, recording the name of king Talpus-Atili of Nagar, who ruled during or slightly after the reign of Naram-Sin's son Shar-Kali-Sharri. The view that Tell Brak came under the control of Ur III is refused, and evidence exists for a Hurrian rebuilding of Naram-Sin's palace, erroneously attributed by Max Mallowan to Ur-Nammu of Ur. Period N saw a reduction in the city's size, with public buildings being abandoned, and the lower town evacuated. Few short lived houses were built in area CH during period N, and although greatly reduced in size, archaeology provided evidence for continued occupation in the city, instead of abandonment.

Foreign rule and later periods

During period P, Nagar was densely populated in the northern ridge of the tell. The city came under the rule of Mari, and was the site of a decisive victory won by Yahdun-Lim of Mari over Shamshi-Adad I of Assyria. Nagar lost its importance and came under the rule of Kahat in the 18th century BC.

During period Q, Tell Brak was an important trade city in the Mitanni state. A two-story palace was built c. 1500 BC in the northern section of the tell, in addition to an associated temple. However, the rest of the tell was not occupied, and a lower town extended to the north but is now all but destroyed through modern agriculture. Two Mitannian legal documents, bearing the names of kings Artashumara and Tushratta, were recovered from the city, which was destroyed between c.1300 and 1275 BC, in two waves, first at the hands of the Assyrian king Adad-Nirari I, then by his successor Shalmaneser I.

Little evidence of an occupation on the tell exists following the destruction of the Mitannian city, however, a series of small villages existed in the lower town during the Assyrian periods. The remains of a Hellenistic settlement were discovered on a nearby satellite tell, to the northwestern edge of the main tell. However, excavations recovered no ceramics of the Parthian-Roman or Byzantine-Sasanian periods, although sherds dating to those periods are noted. In the middle of the first millennium AD, a fortified building was erected in the northeastern lower town. The building was dated by Antoine Poidebard to the Justinian era (sixth century AD), on the basis of its architecture. The last occupation period of the site was during the early Abbasid Caliphate's period, when a canal was built to provide the town with water from the nearby Jaghjagh River.

Society

People and language
The Halafians were the indigenous people of Neolithic northern Syria, who later adopted the southern Ubaidian culture. Contact with the Mesopotamian south increased during the early and middle Northern Uruk period, and southern people moved to Tell Brak in the late Uruk period, forming a colony, which produced a mixed society. The Urukean colony was abandoned by the colonist toward the end of the fourth millennium BC, leaving the indigenous Tell Brak a much contracted city. The pre-Akkadian kingdom's population was Semitic, and spoke its own East Semitic dialect of the Eblaite language used in Ebla and Mari. The Nagarite dialect is closer to the dialect of Mari rather than that of Ebla.

No Hurrian names are recorded in the pre-Akkadian period, although the name of prince Ultum-Huhu is difficult to understand as Semitic. During the Akkadian period, both Semitic and Hurrian names were recorded, as the Hurrians appear to have taken advantage of the power vacuum caused by the destruction of the pre-Akkadian kingdom, in order to migrate and expand in the region. The post-Akkadian period Tell Brak had a strong Hurrian element, and Hurrian named rulers, although the region was also inhabited by Amorite tribes. A number of the Amorite Banu-Yamina tribes settled the surroundings of Tell Brak during the reign of Zimri-Lim of Mari, and each group used its own language (Hurrian and Amorite languages). Tell Brak was a center of the Hurrian-Mitannian empire, which had Hurrian as its official language. However, Akkadian was the region's international language, evidenced by the post-Akkadian and Mitannian eras tablets, discovered at Tell Brak and written in Akkadian.

Religion
The findings in the Eye Temple indicate that Tell Brak is among the earliest sites of organized religion in northern Mesopotamia. It is unknown to which deity the Eye Temple was dedicated, and the "Eyes" figurines appears to be votive offerings to that unknown deity. The temple was probably dedicated for the Sumerian Innana or the Semitic Ishtar; Michel Meslin hypothesized that the "Eyes" figurines were a representation of an all-seeing female deity.

During the pre-Akkadian kingdom's era, Hazna, an old cultic center of northern Syria, served as a pilgrimage center for Nagar. The Eye Temple remained in use, but as a small shrine, while the goddess Belet Nagar became the kingdom's paramount deity. The temple of Belet Nagar is not identified but probably lies beneath the Mitannian palace. The Eblaite deity Kura was also venerated in Nagar, and the monarchs are attested visiting the temple of the Semitic deity Dagon in Tuttul. During the Akkadian period, the temple in area FS was dedicated to the Sumerian god Shakkan, the patron of animals and countrysides. Tell Brak was an important religious Hurrian center, and the temple of Belet Nagar retained its cultic importance in the entire region until the early second millennium BC.

Culture

Northern Mesopotamia evolved independently from the south during the Late Chalcolithic / early and middle Northern Uruk (4000–3500 BC). This period was characterized by a strong emphasis on holy sites, among which, the Eye Temple was the most important in Tell Brak. The building containing "Eyes" idols in area TW was wood paneled, whose main room had been lined with wooden panels. The building also contained the earliest known semi columned facade, which is a character that will be associated with temples in later periods.

By late Northern Uruk and especially after 3200 BC, northern Mesopotamia came under the full cultural dominance of the southern Uruk culture, which affected Tell Brak's architecture and administration. The southern influence is most obvious in the level named the "Latest Jemdet Nasr" of the Eye Temple, which had southern elements such as cone mosaics. The Uruk presence was peaceful as it is first noted in the context of feasting; commercial deals during that period were traditionally ratified through feasting. The excavations in area TW revealed feasting to be an important local habit, as two cooking facilities, large amounts of grains, skeletons of animals, a domed backing oven and barbequing fire pits were discovered. Among the late Uruk materials found at Tell Brak is a standard text for educated scribes (the "Standard Professions" text), part of the standardized education taught in the 3rd millennium BC over a wide area of Syria and Mesopotamia.

The pre-Akkadian kingdom was famed for its acrobats, who were in demand in Ebla and trained local Eblaite entertainers. The kingdom also had its own local glyptic style called the "Brak Style", which was distinct from the southern sealing variants, employing soft circled shapes and sharpened edges. The Akkadian administration had little effect on the local administrative traditions and sealing style, and Akkadian seals existed side by side with the local variant. The Hurrians employed the Akkadian style in their seals, and Elamite seals were discovered, indicating an interaction with the western Iranian Plateau. 

Tell Brak provided great knowledge on the culture of Mitanni, which produced glass using sophisticated techniques, that resulted in different varieties of multicolored and decorated shapes. Samples of the elaborate Nuzi ware were discovered, in addition to seals that combine distinctive Mitannian elements with the international motifs of that period.

Prior to the Nuzi ware, the predominant ceramic tradition at Brak is known as Khabur ware. Nuzi ware retains some shapes of Khabur ware, as well as some of its surface decorations. The fourth and last phase of Khabur ware (around 1500 BC) is generally contemporaneous with Nuzi ware. Both of them occur in parallel for some time at Brak before the Khabur ware disappears.

Wagons
Seals from Tell Brak and Nabada dated to the pre-Akkadian kingdom, revealed the use of four-wheeled wagons and war carriages. Excavation in area FS recovered clay models of equids and wagons dated to the Akkadian and post-Akkadian periods. The models provide information about the types of wagons used during that period (2350–2000 BC), and they include four wheeled vehicles and two types of two wheeled vehicles; the first is a cart with fixed seats and the second is a cart where the driver stands above the axle. The chariots were introduced during the Mitanni era, and none of the pre-Mitanni carriages can be considered chariots, as they are mistakenly described in some sources.

Government
The first city had the characteristics of large urban centers, such as monumental buildings, and seems to have been ruled by a kinship based assembly, headed by elders. The pre-Akkadian kingdom was decentralized, and the provincial center of Nabada was ruled by a council of elders, next to the king's representative. The Nagarite monarchs had to tour their kingdom regularly in order to assert their political control. During the early Akkadian period, Nagar was administrated by local officials. However, central control was tightened and the number of Akkadian officials increased, following the supposed environmental event that preceded the construction of Naram-Sin's palace. The post-Akkadian Nagar was a city-state kingdom, that gradually lost its political importance during the early second millennium BC, as no evidence for a king dating to that period exists.

Rulers of Tell Brak
{| class="wikitable"
!align="center" style="background: #f9f9f9; width: 12em;" | King
!style="background: #f9f9f9; width:19em;" align="center"| Reign 
!align="center" style="background: #f9f9f9;" | Notes
|-
|bgcolor="#dfe4d9" colspan="3" align="center"| Early period, possibly ruled by a local assembly of elders.
|-
|colspan="3" bgcolor="#dfe4d9" align="center"|Pre-Akkadian kingdom of Nagar (c. 2600–2300 BC)
|-
| Mara-Il || Fl. late 24th century BC. ||
|-
|colspan="3" bgcolor="#d0c4a8" align="center"|Early Akkadian period, early 23rd century BC.
|-
|colspan="3" bgcolor="#d0c4a8" align="center"|Urkesh dominance, the Urkeshite king Atal-Shen styled himself "King of Urkesh and Nawar", so did his successors who ruled only in Urkesh.
|-
|colspan="3" bgcolor="#d0c4a8" align="center"|Akkadian control, under the rule of Naram-Sin of Akkad.
|-
|colspan="3" bgcolor="#dfe4d9" align="center"|Post-Akkadian kingdom of Nagar|-
| Talpus-Atili|| Fl. end of the third millennium BC.|| Styled himself "the sun of the country of Nagar".
|-
|colspan="3" bgcolor="#d0c4a8" align="center"|Various foreign rulers such as Mari, Kahat, Mitanni, and Assyria.
|}

Economy
Throughout its history, Tell Brak was an important trade center; it was an entrepot of obsidian trade during the Chalcolithic, as it was situated on the river crossing between Anatolia, the Levant and southern Mesopotamia. The countryside was occupied by smaller towns, villages and hamlets, but the city's surroundings were empty within three kilometers. This was probably due to the intensive cultivation in the immediate hinterland, in order to sustain the population. The city manufactured different objects, including chalices made of obsidian and white marble, faience, flint tools and shell inlays. However, evidence exists for a slight shift in production of goods toward manufacturing objects desired in the south, following the establishment of the Uruk colony.

Trade was also an important economic activity for the pre-Akkadian kingdom of Nagar, which had Ebla and Kish as major partners. The kingdom produced glass, wool, and was famous for breeding and trading in the Kunga, a hybrid of a donkey and a female onager. Tell Brak remained an important commercial center during the Akkadian period, and was one of Mitanni's main trade cities. Many objects were manufactured in Mitannian Tell Brak, including furniture made of ivory, wood and bronze, in addition to glass. The city provided evidence for the international commercial contacts of Mitanni, including Egyptian, Hittite and Mycenaean objects, some of which were produced in the region to satisfy the local taste.

 Equids 
The Kungas of pre-Akkadian Nagar were used for drawing the carriages of kings before the domestication of the horse, and a royal procession included up to fifty animals. The kungas of Nagar were in great demand in the Eblaite empire; they cost two kilos of silver, fifty times the price of a donkey, and were imported regularly by the monarchs of Ebla to be used as transport animals and gifts for allied cities. The horse was known in the region during the third millennium BC, but was not used as a draught animal before c. 18th century BC.

Site

Excavations

Soundings were conducted in 1930 by Antoine Poidebard though little was published.Poidebard, A., I934. La Trace de Rome, Paris. After a survey of the area in 1934, Tell Brak was excavated for three seasons by the British archaeologist Sir Max Mallowan, husband of Agatha Christie, in 1937 and 1938. The artifacts from Mallowan's excavations are now preserved in the Ashmolean Museum, National Museum of Aleppo and the British Museum's collection; the latter contain the Tell Brak Head dating to c. 3500–3300 BC. Two small cuneiform tablets were found and a half dozen fragments, all in the Akkadian period script.

A team from the Institute of Archaeology of the University of London, led by David and Joan Oates, worked in the tell for 14 seasons between 1976 and 1993.Oates, Joan, and David Oates., "Tell Brak: A Stratigraphic Summary, 1976-1993", Iraq, vol. 56, pp. 167–76, 1994 Finds included several Uruk Period numerical tablets and a number of cuneiform tablets and inscriptions.Finkel, Irving L., "Inscriptions from Tell Brak 1985", Iraq, vol. 50, pp. 83–86, 1988 After 1993, excavations were conducted by a number of field directors under the general guidance of David (until 2004) and Joan Oates. Those directors included Roger Matthews (in 1994–1996), for the McDonald Institute for Archaeological Research of the University of Cambridge; Geoff Emberling (in 1998–2002) and Helen McDonald (in 2000–2004), for the British Institute for the Study of Iraq and the Metropolitan Museum of Art. Finds included a large cache of carnelian, gold, silver, and lapis lazuli beads, late 3rd millennium arrowheads, stone maceheads, a range of ceramic wares, and an alabaster statuette of a seated bear.R. J. Matthews., "Excavations at Tell Brak, 1995", Iraq, vol. 57, pp. 87–111, 1995Emberling, Geoff and McDonald, Helen,  "Recent finds from the northern Mesopotamian city of Tell Brak", Antiquity, vol. 76, pp. 949-950, 2002

In 2006, Augusta McMahon became field director, also sponsored by the British Institute for the Study of Iraq. A regional archaeological field survey in a  radius around Brak was supervised by Henry T. Wright (in 2002–2005). The survey data was combined with LANDSAT and 1960s era CORONA satellite images as well as historical photographs. Many of the finds from the excavations at Tell Brak are on display in the Deir ez-Zor Museum. The most recent excavations took place in the spring of 2011, but archaeological work is currently suspended due to the ongoing Syrian Civil War.

A number of Proto-Literate clay tokens were found at the site, mainly in Uruk leveling fill but in one case in a stratified context. Most of the finds were pellets but also cones, discs, and ovioid bullae. In Late Uruk fill a number of large stone spheres and polished teardrops were found.

Syrian Civil War
According to the Syrian authorities, the camp of archaeologists was looted, along with the tools and ceramics kept in it. The site changed hands between the different combatants, mainly the Kurdish People's Protection Units and the Islamic State of Iraq and the Levant. In early 2015, Tell Brak was taken by the Kurdish forces after light fighting with the Islamic State.

See also

Hamoukar
Tell Leilan
Tell Chuera
Tell Aqab
Tell Mozan
Chagar Bazar
Cities of the Ancient Near East

ReferencesInformational notesCitationsBibliography'''

Further reading

General
Biga, M. G., "The Marriage of Eblaite Princess Tagrisˇ-Damu with a Son of Nagar’s King", Subartu, IV, 2, pp. 17–22, 1998
Oates, Joan, and David Oates, "An open gate: Cities of the fourth millennium BC (Tell Brak 1997)." Cambridge Archaeological Journal 7.2, pp. 287-297, 1997

Ur, Jason A., "Urban form at Tell Brak across three millennia.", in Preludes to Urbanism: Studies in the Late Chalcolithic of Mesopotamia in Honour of Joan Oates, Archaeopress, Oxford, 2014

Excavation Related
Ambers, J., "Radiocarbon results from Tell Brak", Iraq 55, pp. 198-199, 1993
Bowman, S. G. E., and J. C. Ambers, "Radiocarbon Dates for Tell Brak, 1987", Iraq, vol. 51, pp. 213–15, 1989
Clutton-Brock, Juliet, "A Dog and a Donkey Excavated at Tell Brak", Iraq, vol. 51, pp. 217–24, 1989
Clutton-Brock, Juliet, and Sophie Davies, "More Donkeys from Tell Brak", Iraq, vol. 55, pp. 209–21, 1993
Emberling, Geoff, et al., "Excavations at Tell Brak 1998: preliminary report.", Iraq, pp. 1-41, 1991
Fielden, Kate, "Tell Brak 1976: the pottery.", Iraq 39.2, pp. 245-255, 1977
Fielden, Kate, "A Late Uruk pottery group from Tell Brak, 1978", Iraq 43, pp. 157-166, 1981
Mallowan, M. E. L., "Excavations at Brak and Chagar Bazar", Iraq, vol. 9, pp. 1-259, 1947
Roger Mathews, "Excavations at Tell Brak 4: Exploring an Upper Mesopotamian Regional Centre, 1994-1996", McDonald Institute Monographs, McDonald Institute for Archaeological Research, July 15 2003 ISBN  978-1902937168
Oates, David, "The Excavations at Tell Brak, 1976.", Iraq 39.2, pp. 233-244, 1977
Oates, David, "Excavations at Tell Brak, 1978–81.", Iraq 44.2, pp. 187-204, 1982
Oates, David, "Excavations at Tell Brak, 1983–84.", Iraq 47, pp. 159-173, 1985
Oates, David, "Excavations at tell brak 1985–86.", Iraq 49, pp. 175-191, 1987
Oates, David, and Joan Oates, "Excavations at Tell Brak 1990-91.", Iraq 53, pp. 127-145, 1991
Oates, Joan, "Excavations at Tell Brak, NE Syria, 1992.", Cambridge Archaeological Journal 3.1, pp. 137-140, 1993

External links

Piotr Michałowski, "Bibliographical information (Tell Brak & related matters)
SciAm: Ancient Squatters May Have Been the World's First Suburbanites
Death and the City: Recent Work at Tell Brak, Syra - Oriental Institute video/audio lecture
White-Levy Brak publication project
BISI Webinar: Prof Augusta McMahon on 'From Tell Brak to Lagash' - Augusta McMahon - Feb 21, 2022
Archaeology breakthrough after spy satellite images unveiled world's ‘first city’ - Express - Mar 8, 2022

 
Populated places established in the 4th millennium BC
States and territories disestablished in the 3rd millennium BC
Akkadian cities
Hurrian cities
Archaeological sites in al-Hasakah Governorate
Stone Age sites in Syria
Former populated places in Syria
Brak
Halaf culture
Ubaid period
Kish civilization
Uruk period
City-states
Former monarchies